IL-8 can refer to:

 Interleukin 8, a chemokine of the immune system
 Illinois's 8th congressional district
 Illinois Route 8
 Ilyushin Il-8